Carl Natanael Rexroth-Berg (9 February 1879, Stockholm – 14 October 1957, Stockholm) was a Swedish composer.

Berg trained in veterinary medicine and began learning music by teaching himself.  He later studied at the Stockholm Conservatory as the pupil of Johan Lindegren.  Until 1939, he served as a veterinarian in the Swedish Army and afterwards he became a freelance composer.

His output included five operas, three ballets, five symphonies as well as several symphonic poems, a piano concerto, a violin concerto, a serenade for violin and orchestra, a piano quintet, ballades, lieder, and pieces for piano.

Chronological list of selected works
Saul och David, 1907
Eros vrede, 1907
Traumgewalten, symphonic poem, 1910
Leila, opera, 1910
Mannen och kvinnan, 1911
Predikaren, 1911
Symphony No. 1 Alles endet was entstehet, 1913
Varde Ljus, symphonic poem, 1914
Älvorna, ballet, 1914
Israels lovsång, 1915
Symphony No. 2 Årstiderna, 1916
Symphony No. 3 Makter, 1917
Piano Quintet, 1917
Die badenden Kinder, 1918
Violin Concerto, 1918
Symphony No. 4 Pezzo Sinfonico, 1918
Sensitiva, ballet, 1919
String Quartet, 1919
Hertiginnans friare, ballet, 1920
Serenade for Violin and Orchester, 1923
Symphony No. 5 Trilogia delle passioni, 1924
Höga Visan, 1925
Engelbrekt, opera, 1928 (Engelbrecht, Braunschweig, 1933)
Piano Concerto, 1931
Judith, opera, 1935
Birgitta, opera, 1942
Genoveva, opera, 1944–46
Tre konungar, Part 1, opera (incomplete), 1950–1954, orchestrated up to 1957

References
 Storm Bull: Index to biographies of contemporary composers. Vol. II. Scarecrow Press, Metuchen, N.J. 1974.
 Hans-Gunnar Peterson, Stig Jacobsson: Swedish composers of the 20th century. Svensk musik, Stockholm 1988.
 Stanley Sadie: The new Grove dictionary of music and musicians. Macmillan, London 1980.

External links
 

1879 births
1957 deaths
19th-century classical composers
20th-century classical composers
Musicians from Stockholm
Royal College of Music, Stockholm alumni
Swedish classical composers
Swedish male classical composers
Swedish Army personnel
Swedish veterinarians
Male veterinarians
20th-century Swedish male musicians
20th-century Swedish musicians
19th-century male musicians
19th-century musicians